Alec Holowka (30 October 1983 – 31 August 2019) was a Canadian indie game developer and co-founder of independent game companies Infinite Ammo, Infinite Fall, and Bit Blot. He was mainly known for the award-winning titles Night in the Woods and Aquaria.

Life and career
Holowka was introduced to programming at the age of eight when his father bought him the book Basic Fun. Eventually he began working with a freeware group called Zaphire Productions. He then worked for a number of failed startups, including one in Winnipeg working on a PC multiplayer fantasy action title and a combat racer in Vancouver for the Xbox 360.

Holowka acted as sound engineer on the 2006 freeware title I'm O.K – A Murder Simulator as a response to American lawyer Jack Thompson's "A Modest Video Game Proposal". Holowka met Derek Yu in the comments section of popular technology website Slashdot in a post regarding Jack Thompson's proposal and along with Chris Hanson and Phil Jones formed the group "Thompsonsoft" for the one-off release.

After its release Holowka introduced Yu to a project he had been working on independently, Yu was interested in the project and the two officially formed developer Bit Blot the week before the Independent Games Festival deadline. The project was released on 7 December 2007 under the title Aquaria, and was the recipient of the Independent Games Festival Seumas McNally Grand Prize for 2007.

In October 2013, Holowka and independent animator Scott Benson successfully crowdfunded the game Night in the Woods under the studio name "Infinite Fall". The game was released in 2017 to critical acclaim and won the BAFTA in "Narrative" and the Seumas McNally Grand Prize at the IGF.

In August 2019, Holowka was accused of physical and emotional abuse by Zoë Quinn, whom he had briefly cohabited with in Winnipeg in 2012. The day following the accusation, the Night in the Woods development team cut ties with Holowka, with Scott Benson writing "We take such allegations seriously as a team". The team stated that other corroborating evidence related to the accusations had been presented to them. The publisher of Night in the Woods, Finji, backed the team's decision, and also postponed plans to publish physical copies of the game in wake of the allegations.

Four days after allegations of abuse were leveled against him, Holowka committed suicide. According to his sister, who posted to Twitter about his death, Holowka had been "battling mood and personality disorders" through his life and "was a victim of abuse". She explained he had been trying to correct his own disorders in recent years through therapy and medication. She also stated that Holowka "said he wished the best for Zoë and everyone else".

Games

References

External links
 Bit Blot
 Infinite Ammo
 Alec Holowka at MobyGames

1983 births
2019 deaths
Canadian video game designers
Video game programmers
Video game musicians
2019 suicides
Indie video game developers
Musicians from Winnipeg
Suicides in Manitoba